Anas Mahamid (born 26 April 1998) is an Israeli footballer who plays as a centre-forward.

Club career

Youth career
Born in 1998, Mahamid played football in several youth team including Maccabi Umm al-Fahm, Maccabi Barkai and Beitar Tubruk. He finally joined Hapoel Tel Aviv youth team.

Hapoel Tel Aviv
In 2015, Mahamid was called up for Hapoel Tel Aviv first team. On 30 August 2015, Mahamid made his professional league debut in Israeli Premier League against Hapoel Ironi Kiryat Shmona at Bloomfield Stadium, replacing Liviu Antal at the 72nd minute by coach Eli Cohen. Mahamid has played 17 games (including a game in Israel State Cup and Toto Cup) since August 2015.

Hapoel Ironi Kiryat Shmona
On 1 February 2017 signed to Hapoel Ironi Kiryat Shmona for 4.5 years.

References

1998 births
Footballers from Umm al-Fahm
Living people
Israeli footballers
Arab-Israeli footballers
Arab citizens of Israel
Association football forwards
Israel youth international footballers
Hapoel Tel Aviv F.C. players
Hapoel Ironi Kiryat Shmona F.C. players
Hapoel Katamon Jerusalem F.C. players
Hapoel Acre F.C. players
Beitar Tel Aviv Bat Yam F.C. players
FC Winterthur players
Hapoel Umm al-Fahm F.C. players
Israeli Premier League players
Liga Leumit players
Swiss Challenge League players
Israeli expatriate footballers
Expatriate footballers in Switzerland
Israeli expatriate sportspeople in Switzerland